The Jesse M. Unruh State Office Building is a building designed by Weeks and Day in Sacramento, California.

It was previously known as the California State Office Building or the California State Treasurer's Building, but in 1987, it was renamed as the Jesse M. Unruh Building by Gov. George Deukmejian in honor of Democratic politician Jesse M. Unruh.

It is located at 915 Capitol Mall and is managed by the California Department of General Services.

The phrase displayed on the south facade, "Bring Me Men To Match My Mountains," is a famous line from the poem The Coming American by Sam Walter Foss.

In September 2008, The Sacramento Bee ranked it the fifth worst state building in Sacramento; its aging interior needed over $10 million in repairs.

References

Buildings and structures in Sacramento, California
Government buildings in California
Weeks and Day buildings
Government buildings completed in 1928
1928 establishments in California